The Little River (Atlantic Ocean) may refer to a river in the United States:

Little River (New Hampshire Atlantic coast)
Little River (Horry County, South Carolina)

See also
Little River (disambiguation)